Josef Winterhalder may refer to:

Josef Winterhalder the Elder (1702–1769), German sculptor
Josef Winterhalder the Younger (1743–1807), German-Bohemian painter